Development is a bi-weekly peer-reviewed scientific journal in the field of developmental biology that covers cellular and molecular mechanisms of animal and plant development. It is published by The Company of Biologists. Development is partnered with Publons, is part of the Review Commons initiative and has two-way integration with bioRxiv.

In 2009, the BioMedical & Life Sciences Division of the Special Libraries Association included Development in their list of top 100 journals in Biology and Medicine over the last 100 years.

Brief history
Originally called Journal of Embryology and Experimental Morphology and established in 1953, the journal provided a periodical that would be primarily devoted to morphogenesis.

In 1987, the journal was renamed Development. The journal's full archive from 1953 is available online. Development is now a hybrid journal and publishes 24 issues a year. Content over 6 months old is free to read.

Scope and content 
Development publishes original research articles and reports, techniques and resources, reviews, and primers across the spectrum of animal and plant developmental biology.

Topics covered include:

 Stem cells and regeneration
 Nuclear programming
 Evolutionary development
 Systems biology
 Neurobiology
 Regional specification
 Morphogenesis
 Organogenesis
 Evolution of the developmental process
 Aetiology of disease
 Epigenetics
 Plant development
 Reproductive biology
 Musculoskeletal system

The journal operates on a continuous publication model. The final version of record is released online as soon as it is ready.

Abstracting and indexing 
Development is abstracted and/or indexed by:

 BIOBASE
 CAB abstracts
 Cambridge Scientific Abstracts
 Current Content
 EMBASE
 ISI Web of Science
 Medline
 Scopus

Development is a signatory of the San Francisco Declaration on Research Assessment (DORA).

the Node 
the Node is an online community that was launched by Development in 2010. It is a place for developmental biologists to share news and information about the field. Anyone in the community can create an account and contribute.

Journal management

Past editors 
Journal of Embryology and Experimental Morphology
1953–1978: Michael Abercrombie
1979–1982: R. J. Cole, R. L. Gardner, R. M. Gaze, P. A. Lawrence
1983–1987: R. L. Gardner, R. M. Gaze, P. A. Lawrence, H. R. Woodland

Development
1987–2002: Chris Wylie
2003–2009: Jim Smith
2010–2018: Olivier Pourquie
Since 2019: James Briscoe

References

Developmental biology journals
Delayed open access journals
Publications established in 1953
English-language journals
Semi-monthly journals
The Company of Biologists academic journals